Jiří Čadek (7 December 1935 – 20 December 2021) was a Czech footballer who played as a defender.

Čadek played his whole professional career for Dukla Prague. He appeared in 328 league matches, though he never scored a league goal. During his career at Dukla, Čadek won the Czechoslovak First League seven times and the Czechoslovak Cup three times.

Čadek was a member of the Czechoslovakia national team and played at the 1958 FIFA World Cup in Sweden, where he appeared in the match against Northern Ireland.

He died on 20 December 2021, at the age of 86.

References

External links
  Profile at Hall of Fame Dukla Praha website
 Profile at ČMFS website

1935 births
2021 deaths
People from Rakovník District
Czech footballers
Czechoslovak footballers
Association football defenders
Czechoslovakia international footballers
1958 FIFA World Cup players
Dukla Prague footballers
Sportspeople from the Central Bohemian Region